Emmelina jason is a moth of the family Pterophoridae. It is found in Brazil.

The wingspan is 20 mm. The forewings are light greyish‑ochreous, with whitish reflections. The hindwings are grey.

References

Moths described in 1930
Oidaematophorini
Pterophoridae of South America
Fauna of Brazil
Moths of South America